Unionville is an unincorporated community in Holmes County, Ohio, United States.

References

Unincorporated communities in Holmes County, Ohio
Unincorporated communities in Ohio